Mallam Adamu Adamu  (born 25 May 1954) is a Nigerian accountant, journalist and politician who is currently serving as the Minister of Education.

Early life and education
Adamu was born on 25 May 1954, in Azare. He received a bachelor's degree in accounting from the Ahmadu Bello University in Zaria. He later received a master's degree in journalism from Columbia University's School of Journalism. He is a polyglot and speaks Hausa, English, Persian, Arabic and French. He is from Bauchi state of Nigeria.

Career
After graduating, Adamu worked briefly as an accountant in Bauchi State before later venturing into journalism. He began his journalistic career as a public analyst and writer on a variety of different themes and subjects; and he later got his first job with the New Nigerian Newspapers as Special Correspondent and member of the editorial board of the New Nigerian group of newspapers in 1984. He rose to become Deputy Editor of the New Nigerian newspaper and chairman of the group Editorial Board. Adamu was also a back-page columnist [Friday Column] for Media Trust's titles and has contributed to many news outlets including Canada-based Crescent International. Adamu also served as a Special Assistant to General Muhammadu Buhari, then chairman of the Petroleum Trust Fund, PTF. Before his appointment as minister, in 2015, he was the secretary and member of Muhammadu Buhari's APC Presidential Transition Committee.

Minister of Education 
Adamu was first appointed Minister of Education by President Muhammadu Buhari on 11 November 2015, along with 35 others, when the president Mohammed Buhari made his first major appointments. He was reappointed on 21 August 2019 after President Buhari was re-elected for second term.

Award 
In October 2022, a Nigerian national honour of Commander of the Order of the Niger (CON) was conferred on him by President Muhammadu Buhari.

See also
Cabinets of Nigeria

References

Living people
Buhari administration personnel
Nigerian government officials
Nigerian accountants
Nigerian journalists
Columbia University Graduate School of Journalism alumni
Ahmadu Bello University alumni
People from Bauchi State
Federal ministers of Nigeria
Education ministers of Nigeria
1954 births